Cool Ground is a former National Hunt racehorse.  He won the Cheltenham Gold Cup in 1992, as well as the Kim Muir in 1989, the Anthony Mildmay, Peter Cazalet Memorial Chase in 1990 and 1991, the Welsh National in 1990, and the Greenalls Gold Cup (now called the Grand National Trial) in 1991.  Adrian Maguire rode him in his Gold Cup win where he won by a short-head over The Fellow with Docklands Express back in a close third.  His victory was a shock at 25/1 (he'd been 40/1 earlier in the day). Toby Balding trained him to win the 1992 Cheltenham Gold Cup, and he was looked after by Kim Tierney.  Cool Ground's only subsequent win was just over three years later.

References

External links
http://news.bbc.co.uk/sport1/hi/other_sports/horse_racing/have_your_say/3503999.stm

1982 racehorse births
Cheltenham Gold Cup winners
Racehorses bred in Ireland
Racehorses trained in the United Kingdom
Welsh Grand National winners
National Hunt racehorses
Thoroughbred family 23-a